Bible translations into Persian have been made since the fourth or fifth century, although few early manuscripts survive. There are both Jewish and Christian translations from the Middle Ages. Complete translations of the Hebrew Bible and Greek New Testament from original languages were first made in the 19th century by Protestant missionaries.

Middle Persian

The only physical survival of pre-Islamic Persian Bible translations are two fragments of Psalms found by Albert von Le Coq found in the Shui pang monastery north of Bulayiq in 1905. These earliest translations into Persian are in the Pahlavi script.

Medieval translation into New Persian

Parts of the Gospels were first translated into Persian in the Persian Diatessaron in the 13th century. Then more sections of the Gospels were translated by the 16th Century Muslim scholar and critic of Christianity Khatun Abadi.

Modern translations

Persian Old Version (POV)
More recently, Henry Thomas Colebrooke's Four Gospels appeared in Calcutta in 1804. A major figure in this work was Henry Martyn, a contemporary of William Carey. In 1811 he journeyed into Persia (now Iran). Together with Mīrzā Sayyed ʿAlī Khan, he translated the New Testament, completing it in 1812. There he sent a copy of his translation of the New Testament to the Shah.  It was published in 1815.

In 1845, translation of the Old Testament from Hebrew by William Glen and Mīrzā Moḥammad Jaʿfar was published in Edinburgh. In 1846, a complete Bible consisting of this Old Testament and Martyn's New Testament was published.

This translation was later revised by Robert Bruce to utilise Persian language that was more current. This was published in 1895, although it is also said to have been published in 1896. This is commonly used and known as the Old Persian Version (OPV), Standard Version or Tarjome-ye Qadim (ترجمه قدیم).

Persian Living Bible (PLB)
This is possibly a 1979 translation from the Living Bible by Living Bibles International.

Contemporary Translation (PCB)
Although it is currently illegal to distribute Christian literature in Persian, Persian Contemporary Translation, also known as Tarjome-ye Tafsiri (Interpretative Translation, ترجمه تفسیری) was published by the International Bible Society in 1995. It is a thought-for-thought translation. It is another commonly used translation. The version was revised and republished in 2003.

Today's Persian Version (TPV)
A new thought-for-thought New Testament translation, Common Language Translation, was first published in 1976. It is also known in Persian as Injil Sharif (Noble Gospel, انجیل شریف) and Mojdeh Baraye Asre Jadid (Good News for A New Age, مژده برای عصر جدید). It is largely based on Henry Martyn's work. Translation of the Old Testament was not completed until much later. When it was finished, it was published by United Bible Societies in 2007. This complete translation is known as Today's Persian Version (TPV) and Today's Farsi.

New Millennium Version (NMV)
This version is called "New Millennium Version" (NMV) or "Tarjome-ye Hezâre-ye now" (ترجمه هزارۀ نو). This translation of the Bible in Persian was completed and published in 22nd of Sep 2014. This translation was made and published by the UK-based Elam Ministries,  This translation is also available on E-sword and a mobile version has also been made.

New World Translation of the Holy Scriptures
A translation of the New Testament in modern Persian was released by Jehovah's Witnesses in 2014.

Pirouz Sayyar
A non-missionary version of New Testament (2008), Old Testament (2014) and Deuterocanonical books (2003) is translated by Iranian translator and researcher, Pirouz Sayyar and published in Tehran.

Dari (Afghan Persian)
Dari (Persian: , Darī, pronounced ) refers to the version of Persian language spoken in Afghanistan, and hence known as Afghan Persian in some western sources. As defined in the Constitution of Afghanistan, Dari is one of the two official languages of Afghanistan. Spoken by almost half of the population as first language, it also serves as the lingua franca in Afghanistan. The Iranian and Afghan dialects of Persian are mutually intelligible to a relatively high degree. Differences are found primarily in the vocabulary and phonology.

Dari, spoken in Afghanistan, should not be confused with Dari or Gabri of Iran, a language of the Central Iranian sub-group,  spoken in some Zoroastrian communities.

Scripture portions were published in Dari for the first time in 1974. In 1982 the complete New Testament was published for the first time by the Pakistan Bible Society in Lahore. This translation had been translated by an Afghan convert to Christianity, Zia Nodrat using Iranian Persian, English and German versions. Its third edition was published by the Cambridge University Press in England in 1989. Zia Nodrat was working on a Dari translation of the Old Testament, when he disappeared under mysterious circumstances. The complete Bible in Dari was published for the first time in 2008 titled "Today's Dari Version" (TDV08).  New revision efforts are underway to modernize this volume. As of September 2022, the NT is available online as TDV22.

Tajiki (Persian of Tajikistan)
Versions in the Tajik language have appeared since the breakup of the Soviet Union into the independent republics of Central Asia.

Comparisons table

See also 

 James Hawkes (missionary)

References

Relevant literature
Thomas, Kenneth with Ali-Ashghar Aghbar. 2015. A Restless Search: A History of Persian Translations of the Bible. (History of Bible Translation, 3.) American Bible Society.

External links 
 New Millennium Version Bible (Online), Kalameh 

 Today's Persian Version (TPV)(Online)
 Old Persian Version Bible (Online), Wordproject
 Old Persian Version Audio Bible (Online), Family Radio
 The Old Testament (London, 1856), HathiTrust
 New Testament in Persian Revised by Rev. Robert Bruce (London, 1882), HathiTrust
 Today's Dari Version (TDV), AfghanBibles

Persian
Christianity in Iran
Christianity in Afghanistan
Persian language
Persian literature